The Lyric Theatre, also known as the Lyric Hammersmith, is a theatre on Lyric Square, off King Street, Hammersmith, London.

Background
The Lyric Theatre was originally a music hall established in 1888 on Bradmore Grove, Hammersmith. Success as an entertainment venue led it to be rebuilt and enlarged on the same site twice, firstly in 1890 and then in 1895 by the English theatrical architect Frank Matcham. The 1895 reopening, as The New Lyric Opera House, was accompanied by an opening address by the famous actress Lillie Langtry.

In 1966 the theatre was due to be closed and demolished. However, a successful campaign to save it led to the auditorium being dismantled and reinstalled piece by piece within a modern shell on its current site on King Street a short distance from the former Bradmore Grove location. The relocated theatre opened in 1979.

It has two main performance areas: the Main House, a 550-seat 19th-century auditorium maintaining the original design which hosts its main productions; and the 120-seat Studio, which houses smaller productions by up-and-coming companies. The Lyric also presents frequent Lyric Children and Lyric Music performances as well as Sunday Night Comedy.

Its current artistic director is Rachel O'Riordan, and its executive director is Sian Alexander.

The Lyric has recently gone through a major redevelopment project, with new facilities for young people and the local community completed in 2015, designed by Rick Mather Architects and was nominated in the 'community benefit' and 'tourism and leisure' categories at the RICS Awards 2016, London.

In 2011, the Lyric won the Olivier Award for Outstanding Achievement in an Affiliate Theatre for Sean Holmes' production of Sarah Kane's Blasted.

In September 2018, it was announced that Sean Holmes would be succeeded as artistic director in February 2019 by Rachel O'Riordan.

Five strands
The Lyric's programme is divided into five strands:
Main House
Studio
Music & Comedy
Lyric Children
Lyric Young Company

Production history
(Source: the Lyric official website)
  A Doll's House 2019
  Noises Off 2019
  Ghost Stories 2019
 City of Glass, 2017
 The Seagull, 2017
 Herons, by Simon Stephens, 2016
 Cinderella, 2015
 Tipping The Velvet, 2015
 Bugsy Malone, 2015
 Secret Theatre, 2015
 Secret Theatre, 2014
 Secret Theatre, 2013
 Steptoe and Son produced by Kneehigh Theatre, 2013
 Metamorphosis by Franz Kafka, adapted by Gísli Örn Garðarsson and David Farr, 2013
 Alice by Heart by Steven Sater and Duncan Sheik, 2012
 Father Christmas by Raymond Briggs, adapted by Pins and Needles Productions, 2012
 Cinderella by Joel Horwood and Morgan Lloyd Malcolm, 2012
 Desire Under the Elms by Eugene O'Neill, 2012
 Morning by Simon Stephens, 2012
 Three Kingdoms by Simon Stephens, 2012
 A Midsummer Night's Dream by William Shakespeare, 2012
 Lovesong by Abi Morgan, 2012
 Aladdin by Joel Horwood, Morgan Lloyd Malcolm and Steve Marmion, 2011
 Saved by Edward Bond, 2011
 The Wild Bride created by Kneehigh Theatre, 2011
 Mogadishu by Vivienne Franzmann, 2011
 Roald Dahl's Twisted Tales, 2011
 Dick Whittington and his Cat, by Joel Horwood, Morgan Lloyd Malcolm and Steve Marmion, 2010
 Blasted by Sarah Kane, 2010
 The Big Fella (21 September – 16 October 2010)
 Punk Rock by Simon Stephens, 2010
 Lifegame (7 – 17 July 2010)
 Tightrope (17 – 19 June 2010)
 A Thousand Stars Explode in the Sky (7 May – 5 June 2010)
 Spymonkey's Moby Dick (20 April – 1 May 2010)
 Ghost Stories (24 February – 3 April 2010)
 Three Sisters (6 January – 20 February 2010)
 Jack and the Beanstalk (21 November 2009 – 9 January 2010
 Comedians (7 October – 14 November 2009)
 Punk Rock 2009 (3–26 September 2009)
 Spyski/The Importance of Being Ernest (3 October – 1 November 2008)
 Christmas For the Under 7s (29 November 2007 – 5 January 2008)
 Beauty and the Beast (6 – 24 November 2007)
 Casanova (16 October – 3 November 2007)
 Water (25 September – 13 October 2007)
 Rough Crossings (5 – 22 September 2007)
 The Bacchae (2 – 4 August 2007)
 Accidental Heroes (21 June – 22 July 2007)
 Angels in America: Part 2 (20 June – 22 July 2007)
 Angels in America: Part 1 (7 – 9 June 2007)
 Elegy (26 April – 26 May 2007)
 Absolute Beginners (3 – 14 April 2007)
 St George and the Dragon (13 – 31 March 2007)
 Don't Look Now (9 February – 10 March 2007)
 Ramayana (17 January – 3 February 2007)
 Cymbeline (23 November 2006 – 13 January 2007)
 Watership Down (31 October – 18 November 2006)
 pool (29 September – 28 October 2006)
 Metamorphosis (16 May – 17 June 2006)
 Aurélia's Oratorio (12 – 29 April 2006)
 The Wolves in the Walls (24 February – 1 April 2006)
 The Odyssey (20 January – 18 February 2006)
 Nights at the Circus Christmas (2 December 2005 – 14 January 2006)
 The Magic Carpet (1 – 26 November 2005)
 Brontë (1929 October 2005)
 Road to Nowhere (2 September – 15 October 2005)
 Julius Caesar (30 June – 23 July 2005)
 Some Girls Are Bigger Than Others (17 June 2005)
 Asterisk (1013 June 2005)
 Stars Are Out Tonight (19 April – 7 May 2005)
 Hymns (30 March – 16 April 2005)
 Aurelia's Oratorio (5 – 26 March 2005)
 Rhinoceros (18 February – 26 March 2005)
 A Raisin in the Sun (27 January – 12 February 2005)
 Strictly Dandia Christmas for 7+s (26 November 2004 – 22 January 2005)
 The Firework-Maker's Daughter  (2 – 20 November 2004)
 The Bacchae (30 September – 30 October 2004)
 Don Juan (14 – 25 September 2004)
 A Passage to India/National Youth Theatre Guest Season/The Master and Margarita (20 August – 11 September 2004)
 Aladdin by Sandy Wilson, 1979

Artistic directors of the Lyric Hammersmith

References

External links

 Lyric – Official website of the Lyric Hammersmith Theatre.
Lyric Hammersmith at The London Theatre Guide
Artistic Associates Named
The collection of Lyric Theatre Hammersmith box office returns from 1964 to 1966 is held by the Victoria and Albert Museum Theatre and Performance Department.
History of the Lyric, Hammersmith

Theatres in the London Borough of Hammersmith and Fulham
Producing house theatres in London
Theatres completed in 1895
Rebuilt buildings and structures in the United Kingdom
Theatres completed in 1979
Hammersmith